Golden Princess Film Production was a Hong Kong production company and film distributor.

The company was established as Golden Princess Amusement Co. Ltd., which originally distributed Western films and ran a circuit of theatres located on the major streets of Hong Kong in the late 1970s, with the backing of Lawrence Louey, a director of Kowloon Development whose family then owned Kowloon Motor Bus.

Having invested in independent film companies like Cinema City, Always Good and Magnum in 1980s, Golden Princess began to distribute Chinese films and, together with Cinema City, became the third power of Hong Kong cinema, competing with Shaw Brothers and Golden Harvest for nearly a decade.

Later, when Cinema City's productions slowed down, Golden Princess set up its own company, Golden Princess Film Production Ltd. The first film made was I Love Maria/Roboforce. It also produced a number of films directed by John Woo before he moved to Hollywood, including The Killer, Bullet in the Head, The 10,000 Bullets, Once a Thief and Hard Boiled.

With the decline of the Hong Kong film market in the mid-1990s, Golden Princess eventually withdrew from the cinema operation, film distribution and production businesses. Its last film was Peace Hotel in 1995, which was also the last Hong Kong film in which Chow Yun Fat starred before moving to Hollywood. Its films were acquired by Star TV.

References

External links
 Golden Princess Film Production Ltd. at the IMDb

Film production companies of Hong Kong